Cancer treatment centres in Singapore are generally located in both public and private hospitals. These units and medical centres specialise in the treatment of cancer (oncology).
 Raffles Hospital 
 Parkway East Hospital - Parkway Cancer Centre
 Gleneagles Hospital - Parkway Cancer Centre
 Tan Tock Seng Hospital
 Singapore General Hospital
 KK Women's and Children's Hospital
 Mount Elizabeth Hospital - Parkway Cancer Centre
 National Cancer Centre
 National University Hospital
 Changi General Hospital

References 

Singapore-related lists